The Crimson Code, also known as Red Team,  is a 1999 crime thriller film starring Patrick Muldoon, C. Thomas Howell, Cathy Moriarty, Tim Thomerson and Fred Ward.

Story
FBI Agent Jason Chandler (Patrick Muldoon, "Stigmata," "Starship Troopers") has devoted his life to enforcing the law. But on the trail of a series of mysterious murders surrounding some of society's deadliest serial killers, Chandler is forced down a path where no one can be trusted. It develops that psychopathic killers are themselves being meticulously murdered in grisly circumstances. As he searches for the truth, Chandler finds his own life at risk.

External links
 
 

1999 films
1999 crime thriller films
1990s English-language films